QHC means Honorary Chaplain to the Queen.

QHC may also stand for:

 Queensland Housing Commission
Quorum Health Corporation